The Switzerland national netball team represent Switzerland in international netball tests and competitions. As of 7 March 2018, they are ranked 36th in the world. Established in 2009, Swiss Netball is a full member of the International Netball Federation (INF) and Netball Europe. Swiss Netball has worked hard to develop the game at the junior club level, as well as at senior level, and the national squad first obtained a world ranking in 2012.

Junior Team

Switzerland have participated in the U17 Netball Europe Championships every year since 2010.

Senior Team 
The Swiss Netball Nationalkader/Cadre national was established in 2012. A squad of 15 represented Switzerland at Netball Europe World Ranking Tournament in Gibraltar, May 2012. Over 4 days, the squad played 8 ranking matches against Israel, Malta, Gibraltar and the Republic of Ireland in order to begin their campaign to climb the ranking ladder. In May 2013 the team represented Switzerland at the Netball Europe Open Championships in Aberdeen. Switzerland won the Silver Medal in the Development Section of the Championships and Player of the Tournament. Switzerland has continued to attend and organise international ranking events in order to improve their standing and is currently ranked 28th in the world.

See also
 Netball Switzerland
 Women's sports
 Sport in Switzerland

References

National netball teams of Europe
N